Talat Yai is a tambon (subdistrict) of Doi Saket District, in Chiang Mai Province, Thailand. In 2005 it had a population of 3,760 people. The tambon contains five villages.

References

Tambon of Chiang Mai province
Populated places in Chiang Mai province